The Arctic foothills tundra is an ecoregion of the far north of North America, lying inland from the north coast of Alaska. This is permafrost tundra with an average annual temperature below freezing.

Setting
This is a hilly area that lies between the boggier Arctic coastal tundra to the north and the Brooks Range to the south, and stretching from the Chukchi Sea east across northern Alaska to the border with Canada's Yukon Territory. The Noatak River valley is the only forested area.

Flora
The main vegetation is the scrubby cottongrass (Eriophorum vaginatum), stiff sedge (Carex bigelowii) and shrubs such as Betula nana, Empetrum nigrum, Rhododendron subarcticum, and the berry Vaccinium vitis-idaea.

Fauna
The Colville River is a migration route for wildlife including moose, and a breeding area for gyrfalcon, peregrine falcon, and rough-legged hawks. The ecoregion is also home to a number of waterbirds.
Mammals include the large ungulates moose (Alces alces) and caribou (Rangifer tarandus), the predators brown bear (Ursus arctos) and wolf (Canis lupus) breed here, while smaller mammals include Alaskan hare (Lepus othus) and Arctic ground squirrel (Spermophilus parryi).

Threats and preservation
This ecoregion is unspoilt except that it is crossed by the Dalton Highway and the Trans-Alaska Pipeline, which can disrupt migratory behaviour of some wildlife. The east end of the ecoregion is part of the Arctic National Wildlife Refuge.

See also
 List of ecoregions in the United States (WWF)

References

Ecoregions of Alaska
Flora of Alaska
Nearctic ecoregions
Tundra ecoregions